McLeans is a ghost town located in Esmeralda County, Nevada and former station on the Tonopah and Goldfield Railroad east of Blair Junction and west of Millers.

The name was changed to Gilbert Junction in 1925.  The name McLeans is thought to honor David McLean, who moved to White Pine County, Nevada in the 1870s from Nova Scotia.  In 1891, McLean started ranching in Nye County, Nevada, near Tonopah and later moved to Esmeralda County.

References

Ghost towns in Esmeralda County, Nevada
Ghost towns in Nevada